Aurora Snow is an American retired pornographic actress, director, and columnist.

Early life
Snow was raised by a single mother and was the oldest of three siblings.

Career

Adult films
Snow entered the pornographic entertainment industry when she was 18 years old, planning to work in porn for only a year.
One of her first professionally made and distributed movies was More Dirty Debutantes 152, produced by Ed Powers.

Snow was a contract performer and director for Sin City between May 2003 and May 2005. She made her directorial debut for the company with the film Assploitations. Snow hosted Private Calls on Playboy TV.

In July 2010, she reported on the obscenity case against John Stagliano for Adult Video News.

Despite not using condoms during most of her scenes, she came out as one of the few performers in favor of the 2012 Measure B vote in Los Angeles, mandating the use of condoms for all pornographic movie scenes.
Snow left the pornographic film industry after ten years in 2011 and moved from Los Angeles to Macon, Missouri.

Mainstream media appearances
Snow appeared in the 2002 feature film The Rules of Attraction as Masked Naked Girl at Party.

Snow appeared in a cameo in the Judd Apatow film Superbad. On January 6, 2010, Snow appeared in an episode of 1000 Ways to Die titled "Death On Arrival" to discuss edible underwear during the "Way to Die #444: Deadliest Munch" segment of the episode.

On March 12, 2013, Snow appeared on The Young Turks to discuss racism in pornography and the reasons why some Caucasian pornographic actresses refuse to do interracial sex scenes.

Snow has been a contributor for The Daily Beast and Glammonitor, writing articles about the porn industry and women's issues.

On March 6, 2014, Snow spoke at Harvard Law School on the topic of "Sex, Drugs, and Rolling Dice: The Regulation of Vice." On March 19, 2015, Snow spoke at the University of South Carolina School of Law on "Vice, Porn and American Culture."

Personal life
In September 2013, Snow wrote an article for The Daily Beast titled "A Porn Star's Letter to Her Unborn Son" in which she announced she was pregnant with her first child and stated how she would explain her choice to work in the porn industry to her son once he is older. The letter quickly went viral on the Internet. She gave birth to her son in December 2013. Her father stated that he was proud upon finding out about her occupation.

Awards
 2002 XRCO Award – Best Threeway Sex Scene (Up Your Ass 18) with Mr. Marcus & Lexington Steele
 2002 XRCO Award – Best Group Sex Scene (Gangbang Auditions 7)
 2002 XRCO Award – Cream Dream
 2003 XRCO Award – Best Threeway Sex Scene (Trained Teens) with Gauge & Jules Jordan
 2003 AVN Award – Female Performer of the Year
 2011 XRCO Hall of Fame inductee
 2017 AVN Hall of Fame inductee

References

External links

 
 
 

American pornographic film actresses
American pornographic film directors
Women pornographic film directors
Pornographic film actors from California
Film directors from California
Film directors from New Mexico
University of California, Irvine alumni
Glendale Community College (California) alumni
American women writers
People from Santa Maria, California
Living people
People from Macon, Missouri
Film directors from Missouri
Year of birth missing (living people)
21st-century American women